Agrela may refer to two parishes in Portugal:

Agrela (Fafe), a parish in the municipality of Fafe
Agrela (Santo Tirso), a parish in the municipality of Santo Tirso